Carlos Prieto was born in Mexico City and is a Mexican cellist and writer. He has received enthusiastic public acclaim and won excellent reviews for his performances throughout the United States, Europe, Russia and the former Soviet Union, Asia, and Latin America. The New York Times review of his Carnegie Hall debut raved, "Prieto knows no technical limitations and his musical instincts are impeccable."

He plays a Stradivarius cello named the "Piatti" after Carlo Alfredo Piatti, affectionately nicknamed "Chelo Prieto" by the current owner. He is a promoter of contemporary, original classical instrument music by Latin American composers. The Carlos Prieto International Cello Competition is held every three years in Mexico.  His son, Carlos Miguel Prieto, is music director of the National Symphony Orchestra of Mexico.

Early years
Prieto began playing the cello at age four, studying under the instruction of Hungarian cellist Imre Hartman, and also with the Mexican cellist Manuel Garnica Fierro.

Prieto was a longtime friend of Igor Stravinsky. When Stravinsky returned to Russia in 1962 after a fifty-year absence, he was accompanied in Moscow by Prieto, who was at that time studying at the Moscow State University in Russia.  He also knew Shostakovich and has premiered his first Cello Concerto in different cities in Mexico as well as in Spain.

He continued his instruction with Pierre Fournier in Geneva and Leonard Rose in New York. He also studied engineering and economics at the Massachusetts Institute of Technology (MIT), university, which appointed him in 1993 member of its Department of Music and Theater Arts Visiting Committee.

Music career
He has played with orchestras from all over the world, the Royal Philharmonic in London, the Chamber Orchestra of the European Union, the American Symphony Orchestra in New York, the Boston Pops in Symphony Hall, the Berlin Symphony Orchestra, the Moscow Chamber Orchestra, the St. Petersburg Chamber Orchestra, the Spanish National Orchestra, the Spanish Radio, and Television Orchestra, the Irish National Orchestra, the MAV Budapest Orchestra, and many others. He has been invited to many of the world's most prestigious halls, such as Carnegie Hall and Lincoln Center in New York, Kennedy Center in Washington; Dorothy Chandler Pavilion in Los Angeles; Roy Thomson in Toronto; Barbican Hall and Wigmore Hall in London; Salle Gaveau and Salle Pleyel in Paris; Philharmonic Hall in St. Petersburg, Russia; Auditorio Nacional in Madrid; The Beijing and Shanghai Concert Halls; the Europalia, Granada, Berlin Festivals, etc.

He was appointed Honorary Member of the Fine Arts Advisory Council of the University of Texas at Austin.

From 1995 to 2010 was Chairman of the Foundation of the Conservatory of Las Rosas, the oldest conservatory of the Americas and Mexico's most ambitious music education project.

Every three years, the National Council for the Arts of Mexico and the Las Rosas Conservatory organize the Carlos Prieto International Cello Competition, so named in recognition of his career and work in promoting and enriching Latin American cello music. 

In recent years he played a series of concerts with Yo-Yo Ma in Mexico, Caracas, New Orleans, Chicago, Spain and Cuba.

Writing career 
Prieto has recorded over 100 works and written ten books: Russian Letters, Around the World with the Cello, From the USSR to Russia, The Adventures of a Cello –translated into Portuguese, Russian, and English- Paths and Images of Music, Five Thousand Years of Words (with a foreword by Carlos Fuentes); Throughout China with the Cello with a foreword by Yo-Yo Ma; Dmitri Shostakovich, genius and drama; Short history of music in Mexico, and My musical tours around the world. Music in Mexico and autobiographical notes. Some have been translated into English, Russian and Portuguese and have appeared in audiobook form.

In 2011 he was elected a Member of the Mexican Academy of the Spanish Language. In 2012 he was elected honorary member of the Ecuador Academy of the Spanish Language and, in 2016, of the Chile Academy of the Spanish Language.

Discography
Espejos (Mirrors)

 Ernesto Halffter. Canzona e Pastorella
 Tomás Marco. Primer Espejo de Falla
 Mario Lavista. Tres Danzas Seculares
 J. Gutiérrez Heras. Canción en el Puerto
 Manuel Castillo. Alborada
 Rodolfo Halffter. Sonata

(urtext digital classics jbcc 015)

Le Grand Tango

Le Grand Tango
Piazzolla. Le Grand tango
Piazzolla. Milonga
Piazzolla. Michelangelo 70
Piazzolla. Balada para mi Muerte
Ginastera. Triste para cello y piano
Villa-Lobos. Aria de Bachianas Brasileiras no. 5
Federico Ibarra. Sonata 
Robert R. Rodríguez. Lull-A- Bear 
Manuel Enríquez. Fantasía 
(urtext digital classics jbcc 014)

Dmitri Shostakovich. Sonatas

Sonata op. 40
Sonata op. 147 (transcrita por Carlos Prieto)
(urtext digital classics jbcc 123)

Conciertos y Chôro

Camargo Guarnieri. Chôro for cello and orchestra
Federico Ibarra. Concierto for cello and orchestra	
Carlos Chávez. Concierto for cello and orchestra
(urtext digital classics jbcc 023)

Azul y Verde (Blue and Green)

Ginastera (Argentina) Pampeana
(Uruguay) Piece for cello and piano
Ricardo Lorenz (Venezuela) Cecilia en Azul y Verde 
(Venezuela) Golpe con Fandango
Becerra Schmidt. (Chile) Sonata No. 5 for cello and piano
Celso Garrido-Lecca (Perú). Soliloquio 
Joaquín Nin(España): Suite Española
(urtext digital classics jbcc 024)

Aprietos

Samuel Zyman (México) Suite for two cellos (1999) 
Claudia Calderón (Colombia) La Revuelta Circular (2000) 
Xavier Montsalvatge (España) Invención a la Italiana (2000) 
Juan Orrego  Salas  (Chile). Espacios. Rapsodia (1998) 
Alberto Villalpando (Bolivia) Sonatita de Piel Morena (1999) 
Tomás Marco (España). Partita a Piatti (1999) 
(urtext digital classics jbcc 045)

Tres siglos: tres obras para violonchelo y orquesta

Ricardo Castro. Concerto for cello and orchestra (ca. 1895)
Berlin Symphonic Orchestra. Jorge Velazco, director
Samuel Zyman. Concerto for cello and orchestra (1990) 
Orquesta  Sinfónica Nacional, Enrique Diemecke, director
Joaquín Gutiérrez Heras. Fantasía Concertante para cello y orquesta (2005) 
Orquesta Sinfónica de Xalapa. Carlos Miguel Prieto, director
(urtext digital classics jbcc 178)

Tres conciertos para cello y orquesta

Dmitri Shostakovich. Concerto in E-flat major, op. 107
Celso Garrido-Lecca (Perú) Concerto for cello and orchestra
John Kinsella. Concerto for cello and orchestra. 2000
(urtext digital classics jbcc 083)

Sonatas y danzas de México

Manuel M. Ponce. Three preludes for cello and piano
Sonata en sol menor para violonchelo y piano
Alfonso de Elías. Chanson Triste.
Miguel Bernal Jiménez. Tres Danzas Tarascas (transcritas por Manuel Enríquez) 
Silvestre Revueltas. Tres Piezas (transcritas por Manuel Enríquez
Manuel Enríquez. Sonatina para violonchelo solo
Manuel Enríquez. Four pieces for cello and piano
(urtext digital classics jbcc 033)

Del barroco y del romanticismo al siglo XXI

Haendel-Halvorsen. Passacaglia for violin and cello
Tchaikovsky. Pezzo capriccioso  for cello and piano
Rajmaninov. Vocalise, op. 34, No. 14 for cello and piano
Chopin-Feuermann. Introduction et Polonaise Brillante para cello y piano
Lukas Foss. Capriccio for cello and piano
Francisco Mignone (Brasil). Modinha for cello and piano
Ernst Mahle (Brasil). Ocho Duos Modales for two cellos
Marlos Nobre (Brasil). Partita Latina for cello and piano. (world premiere)
Eugenio Toussaint (México). Pour les Enfants. (world premiere)
(urtext digital classics jbcc 093)

From Bach to Piazzolla

Bach: Courante de suite No. 6 en re mayor 
Rajmaninov Vocalise op. 34 			
Tchaikovsky Pezzo Capriccioso, op. 62				
Falla Tres movimientos de la Suite Popular Española
Gutiérrez Heras. Canción en el Puerto			
Piazzolla; Dos tangos: Le Grand Tango; Michelangelo 70 
Piazzolla Milonga					 
Samuel Zyman. Dos movimientos de la Suite para dos violonchelos
Shostakovich. Allegretto de Concierto, Op. 107
(urtext digital classics jbcc 101)

Seven world premieres

DONALD GRANTHAM.  Son of Cimetière para cello y piano. (2006)
EUGENIO TOUSSAINT. Bachriación. Estudio Bop No. 7 para cello solo	(2005) 
Russell Pinkston. Summer Rhapsody para cello and piano   (2006)
Dan Welcher. Arietta para cello y piano (2006)
Robert X. Rodriguez. Tentado por la Samba para cello y piano.
Samuel Zyman.  Suite para cello solo  (2007)
Roberto SIERRA. Sonata Elegiaca para cello y piano (2006)
(urtext digital classics jbcc 183)

Bach vol. I

The Suites for cello solo.  Suites Nos. 1, 2 y 3
(PMG CLASSICS DIGITAL 092104)

Bach vol. II

The Suites for cello solo.  Suites Nos. 4, 5 y 6
PMG CLASSICS DIGITAL 092106)

Sonatas y Fantasías

Gerhard. Sonata
Ginastera. Sonata
Zyman. Fantasía (dedicado a Carlos Prieto)
Cassadó. Sonata al estilo antiguo español
Rodrigo. Siciliana
Piazzolla. Three brief pieces
(urtext digital classics jbcc 017)

Conciertos para el fin del milenio

Eugenio Toussaint. Concierto No. 2 
Arturo Márquez. Mirrors in the sand
Roberto Sierra. Four verses
(urtext digital classics jbcc 047)

Published works

Spanish 
 Russian Letters (1965) 
Around the World with the Cello Alianza Editorial México. (1987, 1988)
From the USSR to Russia, foreword Isabel Turrent. Fondo de Cultura Económica (1993, 2013)
The Adventures of a Cello –translated into Portuguese, Russian, and English-  foreword Álvaro Mutis. Fondo de Cultura Económica. (1998, 2013) 
“Paths and Images of Music”, Photographs by Miguel Morales (1999)
Five Thousand Years of Words  with a foreword by Carlos Fuentes, Fondo de Cultura Económica. (2005)
Throughout China with the Cello, with a foreword by Yo-Yo Ma, Fondo de Cultura Económica. (2009)
Dmitri Shostakovich, genius and drama,  with a foreword byJorge Volpi. Fondo de Cultura Económica. (2013)
“Short history of music in Mexico”, Seminario de Cultura Mexicana (2013)
My musical tours around the world. Music in Mexico and autobiographical notes with a foreword by Yo-Yo Ma, Fondo de Cultura Económica, 2017

English 
 The Adventures of a Cello – Prologue Yo-Yo Ma. Texas University Press (2006)
 The Adventures of a Cello, Revised edition. Prologue Yo-Yo Ma. Texas University Press (2011)

Portuguese 
 As aventuras de um violoncelo. Historias e memórias – Top Books and Univer Cidade. Rio de Janeiro. Brazil. (2006)

Russian 
 Prikliucheniya Violonceli. – Editorial Orenburgskaya Kniga. Perm. Rusia. (2005)

Awards

1995: Mozart Medal from the Austrian Ambassador in Mexico
1999: Achievement Award of the Mexican Cultural Institute of New York
1999: France awarded the Order of the Arts and Letters in the grade of Officer
2001: Indiana University awarded the Eva Janzer Award, entitled “Chevalier du Violoncelle”
2002: School of Music of Yale University awarded the Cultural Leadership Citation
2006: The Order of Merit, awarded by the King of Spain.
2006 The title of Venezuelan Youth Emeritus Master granted by José Antonio Abreu, President of the Foundation for the National Network of Youth and Children Orchestras of Venezuela (FESNOJIV).
2007: The National Award for the Arts, given by the President of Mexico.
2008: The Pushkin Medal, awarded by the President of Russia.
2009: Professional Accomplishment Award by the University of Oviedo (Spain)  and (ASICOM).
2012: The Commendation for Distinguished Leadership in the Arts awarded by TCU (Texas Christian University).
2012: The Fine Arts Gold Medal, awarded by the government of Mexico.
 2014: The Robert A. Muh Award from the Massachusetts Institute of Technology (MIT) for outstanding contributions in the  Humanities, Arts and Social Sciences.
2018- ''Embajador Gilberto Bosques'' Award in recognition of his exceptional careers and contributions to the cultures of their countries.
2018-  The Harold Gramatges Honorary Award  given by the Union of Writers and Artists of Cuba.

References

External links
Carlos Prieto website
Profile

Living people
1937 births
Mexican classical cellists
National Conservatory of Music of Mexico alumni